Pueblo West is a census-designated place (CDP) in and governed by Pueblo County, Colorado, United States. The CDP is part of the Pueblo, CO Metropolitan Statistical Area. The population of the Pueblo West CDP was 32,842 according to the United States Census 2020. The Pueblo West Metropolitan District provides services. The Pueblo post office  serves Pueblo West postal addresses.

History

The area that is now known as Pueblo West was undeveloped rangeland
before Robert P. McCulloch, land developer and oil magnate, and his company McCulloch Properties, Inc. came to Colorado. Historically occupied by Ute and Comanche people, most recently the land was used for ranching, supported by the water from the Arkansas River. Receiving inspiration from the neighboring City of Pueblo, Colorado and the momentum of successfully creating Lake Havasu City, Arizona, McCulloch and his company formally founded the Pueblo West Metropolitan District (the District) on September 16, 1969. Not long after the creation of the District, McCulloch built the Pueblo West Inn where guests were treated to a luxurious experience in an effort to sell land in the rolling prairies of the new community. The Pueblo West News, the District's first newspaper, reported by 1974 over 2,000 new residents had moved into Pueblo West, and Pueblo School District 70 founded Pueblo West Elementary with 200 students enrolling in the fall.  In 1977 McCulloch Properties pleaded guilty to criminal fraud for large‐scale land sales misrepresentation  and was forced to refund dissatisfied customers.  By 2001 Pueblo West was growing too fast to keep up with its water needs, so it bought an upstream ranch, along with its water rights.

Since the 1970s, recreational and industrial opportunities were also being founded on Pueblo West property, including the South Equestrian Center, National Horseman's Arena, the Pueblo West Golf and Tennis Club, and manufacturing company Aspen Skiwear, all making use of the area's expansive plains for their ventures. Pueblo West boasted a population of nearly 4,500 by the early 1980s, requiring the building of Pueblo West Middle School. With developmental opportunities abounding in the North Industrial Park, the economy of the District was growing right alongside its residential areas. Following a population boom in the 1990s, several new elementary schools were built, with Pueblo West High School officially opening in 1996. In the early 2000s, a trail system was laid for the enjoyment of the residents, along with an additional fire station being built to serve the north side of the District. Pueblo West also entered into the Southern Delivery System, a bilateral agreement to supply water from the Pueblo Reservoir to Colorado Springs. Today, Pueblo West is home to over 30,000 residents and boasts a growing industrial center.

In January 2019, the Pueblo West Metro District Board initiated a feasibility study regarding incorporation.

Geography

Pueblo West is approximately 49 square miles in size, and is located along the southern edge of the state's major growth corridor. Situated on Highway 50, roughly 7 miles west of the City of Pueblo and 38 miles east of Cañon City, Pueblo West is bisected by U.S. Route 50, and its north eastern border is adjacent to Interstate 25. Lake Pueblo State Park is situated along the southern boundary of Pueblo West, and the remainder of the community is mostly landlocked by ranch land, conservation easements, and private property.

Climate
Pueblo West, located in Southern Colorado, boasts nearly 300 days of sunshine a year. Spring temperatures typically fluctuate between mid 60 degrees Fahrenheit during the day to mid 30 °F or cooler during the night, and the season also tends to be windy. Summer temperatures average in the 80s-90s °F range, but during the night can drop well into the 30s.

Demographics

Recreation

Pueblo West is an active and family-oriented community. With seven (7) Pueblo West Metro maintained parks, a 3.75 acre fishing pond, an outdoor swimming pool, 16 miles of recreational trails, and 300 days of sunshine each year, Pueblo West has many options for an active outdoor and healthy lifestyle. Desert Hawk Golf Course, owned by Pueblo County, provides residents and visitors with an 18-hole golf course in the heart of the community.

Lake Pueblo State Park where residents and visitors enjoy the best fishing, boating, water skiing, hiking, horseback riding, and mountain biking opportunities Colorado State Parks and Wildlife offers, is no more than a ten-minute drive from any location in Pueblo West. Other major attractions such as the Royal Gorge Bridge and Park, Monarch Mountain, and the Historic Arkansas Riverwalk of Pueblo are nearby.

Government
The Pueblo West Metropolitan District operates one of the leanest local governments in Colorado, yet still provides robust services to over 30,000 residents, businesses, and visitors.  As a special district form of government, Pueblo West exists to provide services in an unincorporated portion of Pueblo County and is not considered a city. This classification recognizes Pueblo West as a quasi-municipal local government governed by Title 32, Article 1 of the Colorado Revised Statutes. Pueblo West was formed to perform local government functions outlined in the District's service plan. These services include covenant enforcement, fire protection, parks and recreation, public works, and water and wastewater utilities. Law enforcement, planning and zoning, and court services are provided by Pueblo County. In addition, services such as the Health Department, Regional Building Department, and the Pueblo West Library are provided by partnerships between the City of Pueblo and Pueblo County.

The District is governed by a five (5) member Board of Directors whom are elected by registered voters consisting of Pueblo West residents and property owners.  Elections for board members occur in May of even years, and alternate between two (2) seats and three (3) seats.

Pueblo West lies within Colorado's 3rd U.S. Congressional District. For the purposes of representation in the Colorado General Assembly, Pueblo West is located in the 46th and 47th districts of the Colorado House of Representatives and the 3rd districts of the Colorado State Senate.

Taxes
Property taxes serve as the District's primary method of raising general fund revenue, with miscellaneous fees and grants covering the remainder. In 2015, Pueblo West generated $4,337,155 in revenue from property taxes and $1,757,287 in miscellaneous taxes. As an unincorporated special district, Pueblo West is limited in its ability to generate the revenue needed to provide necessary services to its growing population. Of the 3.9% sales tax collected in Pueblo West, 2.9% goes to the State of Colorado, while the remaining 1% goes to Pueblo County.

In November 2015, Pueblo West voters passed a ballot initiative asking for an excise tax on the first transfer of cultivated recreational marijuana within Pueblo West.

In November 2016, Pueblo West voters passed ballot initiative 5A asking for a Tax Payers Bill of Rights (TABOR) timeout to fund the design, construction, and maintenance of a new community pool and aquatic facility. The TABOR time out will sunset in 2026.

Education
Pueblo West is home to 9 Pueblo County School District 70 schools and a charter school, including:

High schools
 Pueblo West High School

Middle schools
 Liberty Point International (formerly Pueblo West Middle School)
 Skyview Middle School

Elementary schools
 Liberty Point International (formerly Pueblo West Elementary School)
 Sierra Vista Elementary
 Desert Sage Elementary School
 Prairie Winds Elementary School
 Cedar Ridge Elementary School

Charter schools
 Swallows Charter Academy High School (Kindergarten through 12th grade)

Transportation

Public transport
Pueblo West is part of Colorado's Bustang network. It is on the Alamosa-Pueblo Outrider line.

Major highways

See also

 List of census-designated places in Colorado

References

External links

 Pueblo West @ Colorado.com
 Pueblo West @ UncoverColorado.com
 Pueblo West Chamber of Commerce
 Pueblo West Metropolitan District
 Pueblo County website

Census-designated places in Pueblo County, Colorado
Census-designated places in Colorado
1970 establishments in Colorado